Scott Christopher Minto (born 6 August 1971) is an English former professional footballer and sports television pundit.

As a player he was as a left back who played in the Premier League for Chelsea and West Ham United and in Portugal for Benfica. He also played in the Football League for Charlton Athletic and Rotherham United and was capped six times by England U21.

Since retirement, Minto has worked as a pundit and occasional co-commentator, notably with Sky Sports and talkSPORT.

Playing career
Minto started his career with Charlton Athletic and made his debut as a 17-year-old in 1988. After over 220 appearances for the Addicks, he moved across London to sign for Chelsea in July 1994 for £875,000.

Minto made his debut for Chelsea in a 6–2 Cup Winners' Cup win against Czech side FK Viktoria Žižkov, and played in every round of the side's run to the semi-finals. His time at Chelsea was plagued by injuries, but he was nevertheless a regular member of the Chelsea defence when fit. In 1996–97, he was an important part of the side's run to the 1997 FA Cup Final, which they won, defeating Middlesbrough 2–0 in what proved to be his last game for the club. He scored five goals in 72 appearances for Chelsea, all of which came in his final season.

In June 1997, shortly after Chelsea's FA Cup win, Minto joined Benfica of Portugal on a free transfer. He remained in Lisbon for 18 months, making 31 appearances, before returning to England with West Ham United for £1,000,000 in January 1999. 

His West Ham career got off to a poor start, losing 4–0 at home to Sheffield Wednesday, but he quickly established himself in the side, as the club secured 5th place in the league – their highest ever Premier League finish. However, his time there was again plagued by injury problems and he was released by the club upon the expiry of his contract in June 2003. He played in 51 league games for West Ham, without scoring.

Minto then joined League One side Rotherham United, but once again injuries hindered his progress and he made just seven league appearances during the 2005–06 season. He announced his retirement from the game in July 2006.

Media career
Minto presented  Revista de la Liga and live coverage of Spanish football on Sky Sports until 2015, when he started presenting live coverage of the English Football League as the deputy lead presenter behind Simon Thomas. When Thomas was promoted to present Premier League football on Saturday lunch times following the departure of Ed Chamberlin to ITV Racing, Minto became the lead English Football League presenter in August 2016. He regularly presents games on Friday evenings, Sunday lunch times and Monday nights, and anchors Sky's coverage of the end of season play-off games. Prior to his presenting work, Minto occasionally made appearances commenting on games from the studio for Soccer Saturday. Minto was replaced on Sky in 2020. 
He previously appeared on talkSPORT's Evening Kick-off show as a co-presenter. Other previous work as a pundit included working for BBC London 94.9's live football commentaries. Minto currently hosts Charlton TV Live, the official Charlton livestream service, on matchdays.

Personal life
In 2008, Minto graduated from Staffordshire University with a degree in Professional Sports Writing and Broadcasting.

Career statistics
Source:

Honours

Chelsea
FA Cup: 1996–97

Individual
 PFA Team of the Year: 1993–94 First Division

References

External links
 

1971 births
Living people
People from Heswall
English footballers
English expatriate footballers
English expatriate sportspeople in Portugal
England under-21 international footballers
Premier League players
English Football League players
Primeira Liga players
Expatriate footballers in Portugal
Association football fullbacks
S.L. Benfica footballers
Charlton Athletic F.C. players
Chelsea F.C. players
Rotherham United F.C. players
West Ham United F.C. players
Alumni of Staffordshire University
English association football commentators
FA Cup Final players